Armit is a surname. Notable people with the surname include:

Barney Armit (1874–1899), New Zealand international rugby union player
Chris Armit (born 1983), Australian rugby league player
Peter Armit (died 2013), Scottish footballer
William Edington Armit (1848-1901), Native Police officer and colonial administrator

See also